The British Rail Class D2/11 was a British class of locomotive designed in 1958 by Brush Traction and Beyer, Peacock & Company, which co-operated to produce five prototype diesel-electric shunting locomotives of 0-4-0 wheel arrangement. They were intended to demonstrate a new generation of diesel shunters for industrial and mainline use. Two were loaned to British Railways for trials and one, number D2999, was subsequently purchased by BR. However, no large scale orders resulted from these demonstrators.

Similar locomotives were built for industrial use, notably for steelworks in South Wales and Yorkshire. These were built by Brush Traction working with Bagnall.

D2999
D2999 was loaned by Brush Traction to British Railways (BR) from  January 1960 and was allocated to Stratford TMD where it was subsequently allocated to the goods yard at Globe Road and Devonshire Street. The locomotive proved popular at Devonshire Street and in September 1960 and subsequently purchased by them for further use. It was classified as British Rail Class D2/11 at this point,  and remained there bar the odd maintenance visit to  Stratford, until 15 October 1967 when it was withdrawn. D2999 is preserved on the Middleton Railway.

D9998
D9998 was on loan to BR for approximately a year from mid-1961.

Sources

External links
 

D002.11
Beyer, Peacock locomotives
Brush Traction locomotives
B locomotives
Railway locomotives introduced in 1960
Standard gauge locomotives of Great Britain
Diesel-electric locomotives of Great Britain